Elli Evangelidou (born 7 May 1968) is a Cypriot athlete. She competed in the women's shot put at the 1992 Summer Olympics.

References

1968 births
Living people
Athletes (track and field) at the 1992 Summer Olympics
Cypriot female shot putters
Olympic athletes of Cyprus
Athletes (track and field) at the 1991 Mediterranean Games
Place of birth missing (living people)
Mediterranean Games competitors for Cyprus